, or Ghost Cat's Mysterious Shamisen, is a 1938 Japanese horror film directed by Kiyohiko Ushihara. Produced by Shinkō Kinema, it stars Sumiko Suzuki, an actress known for her roles in "ghost cat" films (kaibyō eiga or bake neko mono).

Premise
Mitsue is a popular stage actress and the lover of a shamisen player named Seijuro. She jealously murders two other objects of his affection: Okiyo, a young woman from a samurai family, and Kuro, a cat. The spirits of Okiyo and Kuro then merge into a vengeful ghost.

Cast
 Sumiko Suzuki as Mitsue
 Kinue Utagawa as Okiyo

Release
The Ghost Cat and the Mysterious Shamisen was released in 1938.

In October 2018, the Indiana University Cinema held a 35 mm screening of the film.
Two months later film film also screened at the Metrograph independent movie theatre in Manhattan, New York.

References

External links
 

Japanese horror films
1938 films
1938 horror films
1930s ghost films
Films set in Japan